Jean Marie Joseph Capgras (23 August 1873 – 27 January 1950) was a French psychiatrist who is best known for the Capgras delusion, a disorder named after him.

He received his medical degree in Toulouse, later working in several mental institutions in France. During the latter part of his career, he was associated with Hôpital Sainte-Anne.

With his mentor, Paul Sérieux (1864–1947), he contributed on psychiatric publications such as Les Folies raisonnantes (1909) (“Reasoning madnesses. Misinterpretative delusional states”) and  Les Psychoses à base d'interprétations délirantes. With Sérieux, he described a type of non-schizophrenic, paranoid psychosis referred to as Délire d’interprétation de Sérieux et Capgras.

Capgras delusion was described in 1923 in a study published by Capgras and his intern Jean Reboul-Lachaux, titled L'illusion des "sosies" (the illusion of doubles) dans un délire systématisé chronique. This disorder is defined as a delusion that a close relative or friend has been replaced by an impostor.

Notes

References
 Postel J, Allen DF. Joseph Capgras (1873-1950). Psychopathology 1994;27:121–122, .
 Sérieux P, Capgras J, Les Folies rasonnantes, J.-F. Alcan, 1909.

French psychiatrists
1873 births
1950 deaths
People from Tarn-et-Garonne